Cassandra Wilkinson is an Australian author and the president and co-founder of FBi Radio. She is married to former Australian politician Paul McLeay.

Writing career
Wilkinson is a columnist for the newspaper The Australian and the author of Don't Panic - Nearly Everything is Better Than You Think, published by Pluto Press in 2007. Her second book is The Kids Are Alright - 10 Good Reasons to Relax and Let Kids Be Kids. She has made presentations at the Sydney Writers' Festival and the Festival of Dangerous Ideas. She has written individual chapters on happiness economics in Happiness (Spinney Press, 2008) and on effective programs for the poor in Right Social Justice (Connor Court, 2012). Her most recent essay, "Why Australia Should Become  a Superpower", was published in Really Dangerous Ideas (ed. Gary Johns, Connor Court 2013). She is a regular commentator for Sky News Agenda, The Bolt Report and ABC's The Drum. She was featured in Best Australian Science Writing 2012 (UNSW Press).

Career
Wilkinson currently works for Social Finance Pty Ltd, a start-up social impact bonds broker. She was a senior public servant and senior political adviser to the New South Wales Treasurer and other Labor ministers.

Wilkinson was a freight expert, holding the position of Director, Rail and Freight Policy in the New South Wales Ministry of Transport. She was made redundant from this position in January 2009, following the New South Wales government decision to axe executive positions. She was a director in the Economics practice of Deloitte Touche Tohmatsu before returning to work for Premier Kristina Keneally until the defeat of the Labor government in March 2011. 

In addition to being a founder and president of FBi FM, she is a director of Music NSW and of the Human Capital Project, a charity that provides personal equity loans to poor students in Cambodia. She was previously vice president of the Community Broadcasting Association of Australia and a director of Sydney City Farm.

References

Writers from Sydney
Australian essayists
Year of birth missing (living people)
Living people